Patricia R. Foster is a British Electrical engineer. She was named a fellow of the Royal Academy of Engineering, and Institution of Electrical Engineers.

Life 
She graduated from the University of Edinburgh, and the Ph.D. degree from the University of Cambridge, in physics.,

From 1973 to 1979, she was an Engineer with ERA Technology. From 1979 to 1984, she was a manager, New Antenna Systems. In 1984, she founded Microwave and Antenna Systems (MAAS),

Works 

 
 
Foster Patricia R. Radio observations in the short microwave region . Quart . J. Roy . Astron . Soc, 1969 , 10 , No 3 , 206—222

References 

Living people
Year of birth missing (living people)
British women engineers
British electrical engineers
Alumni of the University of Edinburgh
Alumni of the University of Cambridge